Dr. Cook's Garden is a play by Ira Levin. It was adapted as a TV movie in 1971 starring Bing Crosby.

Plot
James Tennyson is a young and idealistic physician who returns to his hometown of Greenfield to work with Doctor Leonard Cook, his mentor who is a father figure to him. Tennyson's father was an abusive brute who broke his arm in a drunken rage. Doctor Cook seems to be a positive role model to Tennyson and a pillar of the community who welcomes his young protégé home. Cook's housekeeper Dora tells Tennyson of Doctor Cook's heart troubles and how he needs an assistant. Upon his homecoming, Tennyson is reunited with Jamey Roush, his childhood sweetheart, and in the process begins to become suspicious of Doctor Cook's activities. He discovers that many of his patients have died suddenly and mysteriously. He also discovers in the doctor's medicine cabinet a large supply of poisons. The town constable tells Tennyson that he feels that the Lord has blessed the town because the "nice" people have lived to an old age and the mean ones have died off. He begins to look through the doctor's files and finds a mysterious code "R", which he notices is also in the doctor's garden, and he interprets it to mean removal of those that the doctor considers unworthy people. Tennyson confronts his mentor, who freely admits to euthanizing those that he considers unworthy. He tells him of killing his abusive father and considers his actions to be of community service, using his beautiful garden as a metaphor. Cook attempts to poison Tennyson, and they wage a battle to the death, which ends in Cook suffering a heart attack and dying after Tennyson refuses to bring him his medicine in a perverse act of final mercy.

Original production
The play premiered on Broadway in 1967 with a cast including Burl Ives and Keir Dullea. George C. Scott was meant to direct but was replaced during rehearsals by Levin.

The play's Broadway production was covered in William Goldman's book on Broadway The Season: A Candid Look at Broadway.

Television film

The play was adapted for television in 1971 with Bing Crosby in the title role and Frank Converse as Dr. Tennyson. It was well received with Variety stating: "Doctor Cook's Garden was an unusually satisfying entry in ABC's ‘Movie of the Week’ series...For Bing Crosby, the title role was an acting triumph. In his long list of films, Garden was only his second straight acting role (the other was The Country Girl in 1955) and he has indeed come a long way since his first ‘doctor’ film – Doctor Rhythm in 1938. Playing a part that easily could have been hammed-up, Crosby let the fictive character take over—no small trick for a star with a forty-year identity as a singer and light comedy artist."

Cast
Bing Crosby as Dr. Leonard Cook
Frank Converse as Jimmy Tennyson
Blythe Danner as Janey Rausch
Barnard Hughes as Elias Hart
Bethel Leslie as Essie Bullitt

See also
 List of American films of 1971

References

External links
  
 

1967 plays
1971 television films
1971 films
ABC Movie of the Week
1971 drama films
Films directed by Ted Post
Paramount Pictures films
American drama television films
1970s American films
Horror plays